Golden Desmond Holt (March 22, 1902 – June 11, 1991) was an American professional baseball player, scout, coach and manager.  An outfielder and third baseman by trade, the native of Enloe, Texas, logged his playing and managing career exclusively in minor league baseball, but served the Pittsburgh Pirates and Chicago Cubs as a coach on the Major League level, and spent two separate terms scouting for the Dodgers in both Brooklyn and Los Angeles.

The ,  Holt played 23 years of minor league ball (1924–42; 1944–47), although he was a playing manager for six of those seasons. He came to the Majors as a coach under Billy Meyer of the Pirates from 1948 to 1950, then scouted and managed in the farm system for the Dodgers from 1951 to 1958. He switched to the Cubs' organization as a member of its College of Coaches experiment from 1961 to 1965, then returned to the Dodgers as a scout through the early 1980s. During that time, he taught Charlie Hough how to throw a knuckleball.

Goldie Holt died at age 89 in Burbank, California.

See also
College of Coaches

References

External links

Coach's page on Retrosheet

1902 births
1991 deaths
Baseball infielders
Baseball players from Texas
Beaumont Exporters players
Brooklyn Dodgers scouts
Charlotte Hornets (baseball) players
Chicago Cubs coaches
Corinth Corinthians players
Knoxville Smokies players
High Point Pointers players
Fulton Railroaders players
Kansas City Blues (baseball) players
Los Angeles Angels (minor league) players
Los Angeles Dodgers scouts
Major League Baseball pitching coaches
Memphis Chickasaws players
Meridian Mets players
Minor league baseball managers
Mobile Bears players
Montgomery Lions players
Newark Bears (IL) players
People from Sherman Oaks, Los Angeles
Pittsburgh Pirates coaches
Ponca City Angels players
Portland Beavers players
Raleigh Capitals players
St. Joseph Angels players
Spartanburg Spartans players
Spokane Indians managers
Yakima Pippins players